Matthias Zimmerling (born 6 September 1967) is a German former football manager and former player who manages Innsbrucker AC.

Playing career
Zimmerling, who played as a striker, began his career in the late 1980s, playing for Lokomotive and Chemie Leipzig in the DDR-Oberliga. He represented East Germany at youth level, and was part of the squad that finished third at the 1987 FIFA World Youth Championship.

After Fall of the Berlin Wall, Zimmerling moved west, joining Hannover 96 during the 1989-90 season. However, he failed to establish himself in the first team, and returned to Leipzig, briefly rejoining FC Chemie (now renamed FC Sachsen). He played out the 1990s with a succession of clubs in the former DDR, playing for FC Berlin, Union Berlin (two spells), Energie Cottbus (two spells), Carl Zeiss Jena, Sachsen Leipzig for a third time, and VfL Halle 96. While at Cottbus he played in the 1997 DFB-Pokal Final. Later in his career he moved to Austria, playing for Austria Klagenfurt followed by spells at a number of smaller local clubs.

Coaching career
After retirement, Zimmerling stayed in Klagenfurt, managing SAK Klagenfurt. He returned to German football in April 2009, when he was appointed manager of FSV Zwickau.

External links
Career stats
Matthias Zimmerling on immerunioner.de

1967 births
Living people
German footballers
East German footballers
Association football forwards
1. FC Lokomotive Leipzig players
FC Sachsen Leipzig players
Hannover 96 players
Berliner FC Dynamo players
1. FC Union Berlin players
FC Energie Cottbus players
FC Carl Zeiss Jena players
FC Kärnten players
VfL Halle 1896 players
2. Bundesliga players
DDR-Oberliga players
German football managers
FSV Zwickau managers
German expatriate footballers
German expatriate sportspeople in Austria
Expatriate footballers in Austria
Footballers from Leipzig
People from Bezirk Leipzig